Odontamblyopus lacepedii, also known as warasubo, is a species of eel goby found in muddy-bottomed coastal waters in China, Korea and Japan. This species can reach a length of  SL. The specific name honours the French naturalist and politician Bernard-Germain-Étienne de La Ville-sur-Illon, comte de Lacépède, publisher of the 5 volume Histoire Naturelle des Poissons who is reported to have illustrated this species under the name Taenioïde Herrmannien.
The species is edible.

As food
Warasubo is a popular dish in cities around the Ariake Sea in Japan, used to boost tourism. Warasubo can be hung by the head and dried, added to miso soup, or eaten as  sashimi. They are prepared in the ikizukuri method, or "prepared alive". If hung and dried, it can be placed in sake to give it a fishy flavour. But first, it must be tenderized to release the flavor. This is also required to eat dried warasubo by itself.

References

External links
 

Amblyopinae
Taxa named by Coenraad Jacob Temminck
Taxa named by Hermann Schlegel
Fish described in 1845